The 1979 Porsche Tennis Grand Prix was a women's singles tennis tournament played on indoor carpet courts at the Tennis Sporthalle Filderstadt in Filderstadt in West Germany. The event was part of the AAA category of the 1979 Colgate Series. It was the second edition of the tournament and was held from 5 November through 11 November 1979. Third-seeded Tracy Austin won the singles event, successfully defending her 1978 title, after defeating world No. 1 Martina Navratilova in the final. Austin was entitled to $20,000 first-prize money but elected to receive a Porsche 924 instead.

Finals

Singles
 Tracy Austin defeated  Martina Navratilova 6–2, 6–0
It was Austin's 6th title of the year and the 9th of her career.

Doubles
 Billie Jean King /  Martina Navratilova defeated  Wendy Turnbull /  Betty Stöve 6–3, 6–3

Prize money

Notes

References

External links
 
 Women's Tennis Association (WTA) tournament profile
 International Tennis Federation (ITF) tournament event details
  Women's Tennis Association (WTA) tournament event details

Porsche Tennis Grand Prix
1979 in German tennis
Porsche Tennis Grand Prix
1970s in Baden-Württemberg
Porsch